The 1st Reserve Division (1. Reserve-Division) was a reserve infantry division of the Imperial German Army in World War I. It was formed, on mobilization in August 1914, from reserve infantry units, primarily from East Prussia, and was part of I Reserve Corps. The division served on the Eastern Front from the beginning of the war until October 1917, after which it was transferred to the Western Front for the war's final campaigns. It was rated a third class division by Allied intelligence, mainly due to its losses in heavy fighting and reduced quality of replacement troops.

August 1914 organization

The 1st Reserve Division's initial wartime organization was as follows:

1.Reserve-Infanterie-Brigade:
Reserve-Infanterie-Regiment Nr. 1
Reserve-Infanterie-Regiment Nr. 3
72.Reserve-Infanterie-Brigade:
Reserve-Infanterie-Regiment Nr. 18
Reserve-Infanterie-Regiment Nr. 59
Reserve-Jäger-Bataillon Nr. 1
Reserve-Ulanen-Regiment Nr. 1
Reserve-Feldartillerie-Regiment Nr. 1
4./Pommersches Pionier-Bataillon Nr. 2

Late World War I organization

Divisions underwent many changes during the war, with regiments moving from division to division, and some being destroyed and rebuilt. During the war, most divisions became triangular - one infantry brigade with three infantry regiments rather than two infantry brigades of two regiments (a "square division"). The 1st Reserve Division triangularized in June 1917. An artillery commander replaced the artillery brigade headquarters, the cavalry was further reduced, the engineer contingent was increased, and a divisional signals command was created. The 1st Reserve Division's order of battle on January 1, 1918, was as follows:

1.Reserve-Infanterie-Brigade:
Ostpreußisches Reserve-Infanterie-Regiment Nr. 1
Ostpreußisches Reserve-Infanterie-Regiment Nr. 3
Posensches Reserve-Infanterie-Regiment Nr. 59
4.Eskadron/2. Garde-Ulanen-Regiment
Artillerie-Kommandeur 71:
Reserve-Feldartillerie-Regiment Nr. 1
II./Reserve-Fußartillerie-Regiment Nr. 1
Stab Pionier-Bataillon Nr. 301:
4./Pommersches Pionier-Bataillon Nr. 2
1.Reserve-Kompanie/Pionier-Bataillon Nr. 34
Minenwerfer-Kompanie Nr. 201
Divisions-Nachrichten-Kommandeur 401

References
 1.Reserve-Division at 1914-18.info
 Hermann Cron et al., Ruhmeshalle unserer alten Armee (Berlin, 1935)
 Günter Wegner, Stellenbesetzung der deutschen Heere 1815-1939, Bd. 1 (Biblio Verlag, Osnabrück, 1993)
 Histories of Two Hundred and Fifty-One Divisions of the German Army which Participated in the War (1914-1918), compiled from records of Intelligence section of the General Staff, American Expeditionary Forces, at General Headquarters, Chaumont, France 1919 (1920)

Notes

Military units and formations established in 1914
1914 establishments in Germany
Infantry divisions of Germany in World War I
Military units and formations disestablished in 1919